Aeromonas bestiarum is a Gram-negative bacterium of the genus Aeromonas which can cause infection in carp (Cyprinus carpio). A. bestiarum is a growing problem in Poland in commercial carp farms.

References

External links
Type strain of Aeromonas bestiarum at BacDive -  the Bacterial Diversity Metadatabase

Aeromonadales
Bacteria described in 1996